Richard Platt Herrick (March 23, 1791 – June 20, 1846) was a U.S. Representative from New York.

Biography
Richard P. Herrick was born in Greenbush (now Rensselaer), Rensselaer County, New York on March 23, 1791.  He was educated locally, trained as a merchant, and owned and operated a general store.

Herrick served in local office, including secretary of the health board, school board member, member of the village board of trustees and president of the board.  He served in the New York State Assembly in 1839.

Herrick was elected as a Whig to the Twenty-ninth Congress and served from March 4, 1845 until his death in Washington, D.C. on June 20, 1846.

He was interred at Greenbush Cemetery in Rensselaer.  There is a cenotaph to his memory at Congressional Cemetery.

See also
List of United States Congress members who died in office (1790–1899)

Sources

1791 births
1846 deaths
Members of the New York State Assembly
American merchants
Burials in New York (state)
Whig Party members of the United States House of Representatives from New York (state)
19th-century American politicians
People from Rensselaer, New York
19th-century American businesspeople